Bobby Pierce (born November 24, 1996) is an American professional dirt late model and stock car racing driver. A competitor in late models, he last competed part-time in the NASCAR Camping World Truck Series, driving the No. 63 Chevrolet Silverado for MB Motorsports.

Racing career

Pierce is the son of Bob Pierce whose late model career in the 1980s and 1990s earned him membership in the National Dirt Late Model Hall of Fame. Pierce began racing on dirt tracks in the “racing” state of Illinois.

Pierce finished second in the 2013 UMP Summer Nationals "Hell Tour". He followed it up by winning the 2014 UMP DIRTcar Late Model national champion. He won the points championship for the 2015 Summer Nationals "Hell Tour" in June / July, and repeated as UMP DIRTcar Late Model national champion for the 2015 season.

Pierce made his first NASCAR start on the dirt for the Mudsummer Classic at Eldora Speedway on July 22, 2015 where he was the fastest qualifier. He won the first heat race and sat on the pole position for the feature in an MB Motorsports truck. He battled for the lead during most of the race and ended up finishing second to fellow dirt ringer Christopher Bell.

Pierce's success prompted Dale Earnhardt Jr. to sign him to JR Motorsports on August 5, 2015 for his asphalt Late Model debut at Hickory Motor Speedway in a Whelen All-American Series race at the circuit. Pierce made his second NASCAR start at Martinsville Speedway, his first experience on a non-dirt track, driving the No. 63 for MB Motorsports.

Motorsports career results

NASCAR
(key) (Bold – Pole position awarded by qualifying time. Italics – Pole position earned by points standings or practice time. * – Most laps led.)

Camping World Truck Series

 Season still in progress
 Ineligible for series points

References

External links

 Official website
 

Living people
1996 births
NASCAR drivers
Racing drivers from Illinois
People from Vermilion County, Illinois